The name Jaureguiberry can refer to:
Geography
 Jaureguiberry, a seaside resort in Uruguay
People
 Bernard Jauréguiberry, French admiral
Sports
 Palais des sports Jauréguiberry, an indoor sporting arena in Toulon, France
Ships
 French Navy Fleet escort (T 53 class destroyer) Jauréguiberry